The 1992 Utah State Aggies football team represented Utah State University in the 1992 NCAA Division I-A football season. The Aggies were led by their new head coach Charlie Weatherbie and played their home games at Romney Stadium in Logan, Utah. The Aggies finished the season totaling five wins and six losses (5–6, 4–2 Big West).

Schedule

References

Utah State
Utah State Aggies football seasons
Utah State Aggies football